Win–loss  may refer to:

 Win–loss analytics, analysis of the reasons why a visitor to a website was or wasn't persuaded to engage in a desired action
 Win–loss record, also winning percentage
 Win–loss record (pitching), the number of wins and losses a pitcher has accumulated either in his career or a single season

See also
 Wins & Losses
 Win, Lose or Draw (disambiguation)
 Win or Lose (disambiguation)
 Win win (disambiguation)
 Zero-sum game